Clearwater Airport may refer to:

 Clearwater Airport (Alaska) in Clearwater, Alaska, United States (FAA: Z86)
 Clearwater Aerodrome in Clearwater, New Brunswick, Canada (TC: CDJ4)
 Clearwater Air Park in Clearwater, Florida, United States (FAA: CLW)
 St. Petersburg-Clearwater International Airport serving St. Petersburg/Clearwater, Florida, United States (FAA: PIE)

id:Bandar Udara Clearwater
pms:Clearwater Airport